Mucor is a microbial genus of approximately 40 species of molds in the family Mucoraceae. Species are commonly found in soil, digestive systems, plant surfaces, some cheeses like Tomme de Savoie, rotten vegetable matter and iron oxide residue in the biosorption process.

Description
Colonies of this fungal genus are typically white to beige or grey and fast-growing. Colonies on culture medium may grow to several centimeters in height. Older colonies become grey to brown in color due to the development of spores.  

Mucor spores or sporangiospores can be simple or branched and form apical, globular sporangia that are supported and elevated by a  column-shaped columella. Mucor species can be differentiated from molds of the genera Absidia, Rhizomucor, and Rhizopus by the shape and insertion of the columella, and the lack of stolons and rhizoids. Some Mucor species produce chlamydospores. They form mold with irregular non-septate hyphae branching at wide angles (>90°).

Reproduction
Mucor mucedo (type species) use asexual reproduction. When erect hyphal sporangiophores are formed, the tip of the sporangiophore swells to form a globose sporangium that contains uninucleate, haploid sporangiospores. An extension of the sporangiophore called the columella protrudes into the sporangium. The sporangium walls are easily ruptured to release the spores, which germinate readily to form a new mycelium on appropriate substrates.

During sexual reproduction, compatible strains form short, specialized hyphae called gametangia. At the point where two complementary gametangia fuse, a thick-walled, spherical zygosporangium develops. The zygosporangium typically contains a single zygospore. Nuclear karyogamy and meiosis (sexual recombination) occur within it.

Clinical significance
Most species of Mucor are unable to infect humans and endothermic animals due to their inability to grow in warm environments close to 37 degrees. Thermotolerant species such as Mucor indicus sometimes cause opportunistic, and often rapidly spreading, necrotizing infections known as Zygomycosis.

Selected species
 M. amphibiorum
 M. circinelloides
 M. ellipsoideus
 M. fragilis
 M. hiemalis
 M. hiemalis f. silvaticus
 M. indicus
 M. mucedo
 M. paronychius
 M. piriformis
 M. plumbeus
 M. pseudolusitanicus
 M. racemosus
 M. ramosissimus
 M. variicolumellatus
 M. velutinosus

See also 
Mucormycosis (a rare infection usually caused by the related genus Rhizopus).

References

External links 

 Mucor at Zygomycetes.org
 Mucor species from Index Fungorum
 Mucor page from Index Fungorum

Mucoraceae
Zygomycota genera